James Neal may refer to: 

 James F. Neal (1929–2010), Watergate prosecutor
 James G. Neal, American librarian
 James Neal (ice hockey) (born 1987), NHL hockey player
 Jim Neal (1930–2011), NBA basketball player
 James Neal (artist) (1918–2011), English artist
 James E. Neal (1846–1908), Ohio politician

See also
 James Neale
 James Neale (Australian politician)
 James Neill (disambiguation)
 James O'Neill (disambiguation)